Dinton Railway Cutting is a 2,600 square metre geological Site of Special Scientific Interest in Wiltshire, notified in 1990.

Sources
 Natural England citation sheet for the site (accessed 24 March 2022)

External links
 Natural England (SSSI information)

Sites of Special Scientific Interest in Wiltshire
Sites of Special Scientific Interest notified in 1990
Railway cuttings in the United Kingdom
Rail transport in Wiltshire
Geology of Wiltshire